Lily Lake (Nova Scotia) could be any one of the following:

Annapolis County
 Lily Lake located at 
 Lily Lake located at 
 Lily Lake located at

Cape Breton Regional Municipality
 Lily Lake located at 
 Lily Lake located at 
 Lily Lake located at

Guysborough County
 Lily Lake located at 
 Lily Lake located at 
 Lily Lake located at 
 Lily Lake located at 
 Lily Lake located at

Halifax Regional Municipality
 Lily Lake located at 
 Lily Lake located at 
 Lily Lakes located at

Hants County
 Lily Lake located at 
 Lily Lake located at

Kings County
 Lily Lake located at 
 Lily Lake located at

Region of Queens Municipality
 Lily Lake  located at

Yarmouth County
 Lily Lake located at

River
 Lily Lake Brook in Annapolis County at

References
Geographical Names Board of Canada

Lakes of Nova Scotia